Euseius scutalis is a species of mite in the family Phytoseiidae.

References

scutalis
Articles created by Qbugbot
Animals described in 1958